Velika Obarska is a village located north-west of the city of Bijeljina in Republika Srpska, Bosnia and Herzegovina.

Sport
Velika Obarska has a football club known as FK Mladost.

External links
 Bijeljina official website (Serbian)  

Bijeljina
Populated places in Bijeljina